Liverpool Plains and Gwydir was an electoral district of the Legislative Assembly in the Australian state of New South Wales, created in 1856 and covering what is now known as the North West Slopes region, including the Liverpool Plains (which includes Quirindi and Gunnedah) and the extensive pastoral district around the Gwydir River in the northwest of the state. It elected two members simultaneously.

In 1859, Liverpool Plains and Gwydir was divided into Liverpool Plains and Gwydir.

Members for Liverpool Plains and Gwydir

Election results

1856

1858

References

Former electoral districts of New South Wales
Constituencies established in 1856
Constituencies disestablished in 1859
1856 establishments in Australia
1859 disestablishments in Australia